Jonathon Carson (born 1991) is a Canadian politician who was elected in the 2015 Alberta general election to the Legislative Assembly of Alberta representing the electoral district of Edmonton-Meadowlark. Jon was re-elected on April 16, 2019 as an MLA for Edmonton-West Henday.

Personal life 
Carson is a trained Electrician, studied at Northern Alberta Institute of Technology, first attaining a diploma in radio and television broadcasting, then later returning for an electrical apprenticeship.
After becoming MLA for Edmonton-Meadowlark, Carson briefly moved into a condo in Spruce Grove. Carson was re-elected as an MLA for Edmonton-West Henday by a narrow margin over UCP candidate Nicole Williams in the 2019 Albertan general election.
He was appointed to be the Official Opposition Critic on Service Alberta in May 2019.
Carson announced he would not seek re-election in May 2022.

Electoral history

2019 general election

2015 general election

References

1991 births
Alberta New Democratic Party MLAs
Electricians
Living people
Politicians from Edmonton
Politicians from Saskatoon
21st-century Canadian politicians